Dooabia puncticostata is a species of moth of the family Geometridae first described by Louis Beethoven Prout in 1923. It is found in Sundaland.

External links

Geometrinae